Kelley Branch is a stream in northern Boone County in the U.S. state of Missouri. It is a tributary of Silver Fork.

Kelley Branch has the name of the local Kelley family of settlers.

See also
List of rivers of Missouri

References

Rivers of Boone County, Missouri
Rivers of Missouri